Gymnoscelis festiva is a moth in the family Geometridae. It is found on New Guinea and on Buru and Sulawesi.

Subspecies
Gymnoscelis festiva festiva (New Guinea)
Gymnoscelis festiva buruensis Prout, 1958 (Buru)
Gymnoscelis festiva jubilata Prout, 1958 (Sulawesi)

References

Moths described in 1903
Gymnoscelis